Babukodi Venkataramana Karanth (Kannada: ಬಾಬುಕೋಡಿ ವೆಂಕಟರಮಣ ಕಾರಂತ) (19 September 1929 – 1 September 2002) widely known as B. V. Karanth was an Indian film director, playwright, actor, screenwriter, composer, and dramatist known for his works in the Kannada theatre, Kannada cinema, and Hindi cinema. One of the pioneers of the Parallel Cinema, Karanth was an alumnus of the National School of Drama (1962) and later, its Director. He received the Sangeet Natak Akademi Award (1976), six National Film Awards, and the civilian honor Padma Shri for his contributions towards the field of art.

Biography
Born into a Kananda speaking family of Manchi, a village near Babukodi in Bantwal taluk of Dakshina Kannada district in 1929, Karanth's passion for theatre started at an early age. His first tryst with theatre was when he was in standard III – he acted in Nanna Gopala, a play directed by P.K. Narayana.
 
 He then ran away from home and joined the legendary Gubbi Veeranna drama company where he worked alongside Rajkumar who also was starting out then as a novice.

Gubbi Veeranna sent Karanth to Banaras to gain a Master of Arts degree, where he also underwent training in Hindustani music under Guru Omkarnath Thakur. Thereafter, along with his wife, Prema Karanth, Karanth set up "Benaka", one of Bangalore's oldest theatre groups.  It is an acronym for Bengalooru Nagara Kalavidaru.  Then, Prema took up a teaching job in Delhi and supported Karanth through the National School of Drama. He was to return the compliment after he graduated from the NSD, and eventually became its director.
 He later graduated from the National School of Drama (NSD), New Delhi, in 1962, then headed by Ebrahim Alkazi.  Between 1969 and 1972, he worked as a drama instructor at the Sardar Patel Vidyalaya, New Delhi after which the couple returned to Bangalore.  Here Karanth dabbled in some cinema as well as music and was involved with the likes of Girish Karnad and U.R. Ananthamurthy in these ventures.
 He then returned to the NSD, this time as its Director in 1977.  As the director of NSD, Karanth took theatre to far-flung corners of India.  He conducted several workshops in places far away as Madurai in Tamil Nadu.  After his stint as the director of NSD, the Madhya Pradesh government invited him to head the Rangamandal repertory under the aegis of the Bharat Bhavan. After rendering yeoman service to the theatre scene in Madhya Pradesh between 1981 and '86, Karanth returned to Karnataka.

In 1989, the Karnataka government invited him to set up a repertory in Mysore, which he named Rangayana and headed until 1995. He was diagnosed with prostate cancer in the late 1990s and died at 8 p.m. (IST) on 1 September 2002 in a private hospital in Bangalore.

Translator
His translations from Sanskrit into Hindi include Swapna Vasavadatta, Uttararama Charita and Mrichchakatika . He has also translated a large number of plays from Kannada to Hindi and vice versa. His translation of Girish Karnad's play Tughlaq into Hindi/Urdu has attained cult status.

Institutions
 1962: graduated from NSD, winning an award as the best all - round student
 1977 - 1981: Director of NSD
 1981 - 1988: Founding director of Rangamandal at Bharat Bhavan, Bhopal
 1989 - 1995: Founding director of Rangayana, Mysore

Legacy
Karanth entered the Kannada theatre scene in the late 1960s and early '70s.  His entry brought about a sea change in Kannada theatre which then was steeped in the old, formal proscenium style.  His plays like Jokumara Swamy, Sankranti, Huchu Kudure and Oedipus to name a few, which were directed in the early 1970s, were hailed as trendsetters.  These plays touched upon all aspects of theatre like language, music, song, stylisation

The innovative use of music was one Karanth's biggest contributions to theatre. One of Karanth's strengths was his ability to draw on classical, traditional and folk forms and fuse them in his compositions.  His plays were less famous for design as for their musical content, which became part of the prose of theatre."

In 2010, at the 12th Bharat Rang Mahotsav, the annual theatre festival of National School of Drama, Delhi, a tribute exhibition dedicated to life, works and theatre of B.V. Karanth and Habib Tanvir was displayed.
Jnanpith awardee Nirmal Verma had once described Karanth as “the authentic desi genius of Indian theatre”.

Plays of B. V. Karanth
Karanth directed over a hundred plays, more than half of which were in Kannada with Hindi close behind.  He also directed plays in English, Telugu, Malayalam, Tamil, Punjabi, Urdu, Sanskrit and Gujarati.  Hayavadana (by Girish Karnad), Kattale Belaku, Huchu Kudure, Evam Indrajit, Oedipus, Sankranti, Jokumara Swami, Sattavara Neralu, Huttava Badidare and Gokula Nirgamana are some of his most popular plays in Kannada.
Of the forty or so plays he directed in Hindi, Macbeth (using the traditional Yakshagana dance drama form), King Lear, Chandrahasa, Hayavadana, Ghasiram Kotwal, Mrichha Katika, Mudra Rakshasa, and Malavikagni Mitra are some of the more popular ones. Karanth also revelled in directing children and directed several children plays like Panjara Shale, Neeli Kudure, Heddayana, Alilu Ramayana and The Grateful Man.

Benaka
In 1974, Karanth started BeNaKa a repertory in Bangalore.  Benaka was an acronym for Bengalooru Nagara Kalavidaru. Benaka stages several hugely popular plays like Hayavadana all across Karnataka and even overseas.  At Benaka, Karanth also took a special interest in children's theatre and directed several plays with children.  This group has been taken care of by Prema Karanth, Karanth's late wife and a noted theatre personality in her own right. She died on 29-10-07.

Contribution to Madhya Pradesh theatre
Karanth was largely responsible for starting the new theatre movement in Madhya Pradesh.  As director of the NSD, at the invitation of the Bharat Bhavan in Bhopal, he organized a training-cum-production camp in 1973.  In the 1980s, he returned to set up the Rangmandal repertory in Bharat Bhavan. This was to be the first-ever repertory in the state and he became the main creative spirit behind the now-legendary Bharat Bhavan.

Rangmandal, for the first time, folk professionals were used for training contemporary actors, and the repertory also included folk performers among its members. Apart from Hindi, plays were also produced in dialects such as Bundelkhandi, Malavi and Chhattisgarhi which created huge ticket-buying audiences for the Rangmandira.

Contribution to Andhra Pradesh theatre
With the integration of Alarippu and National school of Drama-New Delhi, Karanth had contributed three great plays in Telugu. Collaborated with Surabhi theatre of Andhra Pradesh, Karanth conducted three workshops respectively 'Bhishma' in 1996, 'Chandipriya' in 1997 and 'Basthidevatha yadamma'. It is his dedication that Karanth spent his time during the workshops in corner villages of Andhra Pradesh to brought up the dramas.

Filmmaking
Karanth directed four feature films and four documentaries, apart from scoring the music for 26 films. He co-directed films like Vamsha Vriksha and Tabbaliyu Neenade Magane with Girish Karnad.

Awards and honors
Civilian honors
 Padmashri - Government of India, (1981)
 Kalidas Samman - Government of Madhya Pradesh, (1976)
 Gubbi Veeranna Award - Government of Karnataka, (1976)

National Honors
Sangeet Natak Akademi Award (1976)

National Film Awards
 1971 – National Film Award for Best Direction – Vamsha Vriksha
 1971 – National Film Award for Best Feature Film in Kannada – Vamsha Vriksha
 1975 – National Film Award for Best Feature Film – Chomana Dudi
 1976 – National Film Award for Best Music Direction: Rishya Shrunga
 1977 – National Film Award for Best Music Direction: Ghatashraddha
 1977 – National Film Award for Best Feature Film in Kannada– Tabbaliyu Neenade Magane

Karnataka State Film Awards
 1971-72 - First Best Film – Vamsha Vruksha
 1971-72 - Best Dialogue Writer – Vamsha Vruksha
 1975-76 - First Best Film – Chomana Dudi
 1975-76 - Best Music Director – Hamsageethe

Filmfare Awards South
 1972 - Best Director Kannada – Vamsha Vriksha
 1975 - Best Director Kannada – Chomana Dudi

Documentary film on B. V. Karanth
In 2012, Films Division produced a 93-minute film on BV Karanth called BV Karanth:Baba. The film bases itself on BV Karanth's autobiography in Kannada called Illiralaare, Allige Hogalaare (I can't stay here, I won't go there) compiled by well known Kannada writer Vaidehi.

Works
''Tughlaq (Hindi), by Girish Karnad. Tr. by B. V. Karanth. Rajkamal Prakashan Pvt Ltd, 2005. .

References

External links
 
 Natarang Pratishthan: Archive and Resource Centre for Indian Theatre 

20th-century Indian film directors
Recipients of the Padma Shri in arts
Recipients of the Sangeet Natak Akademi Award
National School of Drama alumni
Academic staff of the National School of Drama
Kannada film score composers
Kannada film directors
Indian theatre directors
Hindi theatre
Indian male dramatists and playwrights
2002 deaths
1929 births
People from Dakshina Kannada district
Kannada dramatists and playwrights
Filmfare Awards South winners
Best Music Direction National Film Award winners
Best Director National Film Award winners
Indian arts administrators
20th-century Indian dramatists and playwrights
20th-century Indian composers
Screenwriters from Karnataka
Indian male stage actors
Male actors in Kannada theatre
20th-century Indian male actors
Kannada screenwriters
Film directors from Karnataka
Dramatists and playwrights from Karnataka
20th-century Indian male writers
Directors who won the Best Feature Film National Film Award
20th-century Indian screenwriters
Recipients of the Sangeet Natak Akademi Fellowship